ULPA is an acronym for "Ultra-low Penetration Air (filter)". A ULPA filter can remove from the air at least 99.999% of dust, pollen, mold, bacteria and any airborne particles with a minimum particle penetration size of 120 nanometres (0.12 µm, ultrafine particles). A ULPA filter can remove (to a large extent, not 100%) – oil smoke, tobacco smoke, rosin smoke, smog, insecticide dust.

It can also remove carbon black to some extent.

Some Fan filter units incorporate ULPA filters.

Materials used in ULPA filters 
Both HEPA and ULPA filter media have similar designs.

The filter media is like an enormous web of randomly arranged fibres. When air passes through this dense web, the solid particles get attached to the fibres and thus eliminated from the air.

Porosity is one of the key considerations of these fibres. Lower porosity, while decreasing the speed of filtration, increases the quality of filtered air. This parameter is measured in pores per linear inch.

Method of functioning 
Physically blocking particles with a filter, called sieving, cannot remove smaller-sized particles. The cleaning process, based on the particle size of the pollutant, is based on four techniques:

 Sieving
 Diffusion
 Inertial impaction
 Interception

A number of recommended practices have been written on testing these filters, including:
 IEST-RP-CC001: HEPA and ULPA Filters,
 IEST-RP-CC007: Testing ULPA Filters,
 IEST-RP-CC022: Testing HEPA and ULPA Filter Media, and
 IEST-RP-CC034: HEPA and ULPA Filter Leak Tests.

See also
 High-efficiency particulate arrestance (HEPA)
 Minimum efficiency reporting value (MERV)
 Microparticle performance rating (MPR)

References

External links
 ULPA Filter Efficiency Chart: Sentry Air Systems
 European Standard for HEPA & ULPA Filters — EN 1822
 EN 1822: the standard that greatly impacted the European cleanrooms market
 Ulpa Filter Designs and How it clears the air

Filters
Cleanroom technology